Marc du Pontavice (born January 10, 1963) is a French animator and businessperson who is the producer of Oggy and the Cockroaches ("Oggy et les Cafards"), The Magician, Space Goofs, Kaena: The Prophecy, Rolling with the Ronks!, A Kind of Magic, Mr. Magoo, FloopaLoo, Where Are You?, Atchoo!, Mr. Baby, The Daltons, Ratz, Zig and Sharko and Karate Sheep. He was an executive producer from Gaumont, which is based in France. After leaving the company, he, along with Alix du Pontavice, founded Xilam.

List of TV programmes produced
 Highlander: The Series (executive in charge of production, alongside Denis Leroy)
 The Magician
 Sky Dancers
 Space Goofs
 Oggy and the Cockroaches
 Cartouche: Prince of the Streets
 The New Adventures of Lucky Luke
 Ratz
 Tupu
 Shuriken School (co-produced with José Maria Castillejo)
 A Kind of Magic
 Zig & Sharko
 Hubert and Takako
 FloopaLoo, Where Are You?
 The Daltons
 Rolling with the Ronks!
 Mr. Magoo
 Oggy Oggy
 Chip 'n' Dale: Park Life
 Karate Sheep

References

External links 
 

1963 births
Living people
French animators
French film producers
French animated film producers
French television producers
Film people from Paris
Xilam